Kinch may refer to:

 Kinch (surname)
 nickname of Stephen Dedalus, James Joyce's literary alter ego, as portrayed in Joyce's 1922 novel Ulysses and earlier in A Portrait of the Artist as a Young Man
 nickname of Iven Carl Kincheloe Jr. (1928–1958), American Korean War fighter ace and test pilot
 nickname of Staff Sergeant James Kinchloe, a character in the TV series Hogan's Heroes, played by Ivan Dixon
 Kinch (band), an American indie pop band
 Mount Kinch, British Columbia, Canada, a volcanic knob
 Kinch, Iran, a village

See also
 Kinch v Bullard, an English land law case